Ian Watson (born 27 October 1976) is a professional rugby league coach who is the head coach of the Huddersfield Giants in the Betfred Super League, and a former Wales international who played as a  or  in the 1990s, 2000s and 2010s.

He played for the Salford City Reds, Workington Town, Swinton Lions, Widnes Vikings, Rochdale Hornets, Oldham, Halifax and the Leigh Centurions. Watson was a goal-kicker who holds the appearance record for Wales with 30 caps.

Watson has coached the Swinton Lions in the Championship and the Salford Red Devils and Huddersfield Giants in the Super League. He is considered one of the best British coaches in the game after taking unfancied Salford and Huddersfield to Finals.

Background
Watson was born in Salford, Greater Manchester, England.

Playing career
Watson started his professional career with the Salford Reds coming though from local amateur team Eccles RLFC. 

In July 1996, he joined Workington Town on loan, where he played in the Super League for the first time. 

He returned to the Salford Reds for the 1997's Super League II, making 27 appearances for the club. 

Following the signings of Martin Crompton and Josh White, despite being a firm club favourite Watson was deemed surplus to requirements, and was sold to the Swinton Lions for a fee of £15,000. He spent three years with the Swinton Lions before signing a one-year contract with the Widnes Vikings for the 2001 season. 

He returned to the Super League a year later, re-joining the Salford City Reds on a one-year deal. 

Watson played out the remainder of his career in the Championships.

Coaching career

Swinton Lions
In January 2014, Watson was appointed as player-coach for the Swinton Lions.

Salford Red Devils
He left Swinton Lions in July 2014 to join the Salford Red Devils as an assistant coach. In late 2015, Watson was promoted to interim head coach after Iestyn Harris left the club. He was given the job on a permanent basis for 2016, working alongside Director of Rugby Tim Sheens.

He coached the Salford Red Devils to the 2019 Super League Grand Final defeat by St Helens at Old Trafford.

On 17 October 2020, he coached Salford in the 2020 Challenge Cup Final defeat against Leeds at Wembley Stadium.

Huddersfield Giants
On 19 November 2020, Watson was confirmed as the new Huddersfield Giants coach on a three year deal.

In round 5 of the 2021 Super League season, Watson earned his first win as Huddersfield coach when they defeated Leeds 14–13.
In Watson's first year in charge, Huddersfield finished the 2021 Super League season in a disappointing 9th place on the table. 

In May 2022, he repeated his success with Salford when he steered Huddersfield to the cup final after defeating Hull Kingston Rovers at Elland Road.  On 28 May 2022, Huddersfield were defeated 16-14 in the 2022 Challenge Cup Final by Wigan.

International career
Watson held the record for having won the most caps for Wales, before being surpassed by Rhys Williams in 2022. 

Having made his début against the USA in Philadelphia in 1995, he made 30 appearances for Wales, scoring 7 tries and kicking one goal. 

He played at the 2000 Rugby League World Cup. 

His final appearance for Wales came during the 2011 Four Nations tournament against New Zealand, and he announced his international retirement shortly after.

References

External links

(archived by web.archive.org) Leigh profile
(archived by web.archive.org) The Teams: Wales

1976 births
Living people
English rugby league coaches
English rugby league players
Halifax R.L.F.C. players
Huddersfield Giants coaches
Leigh Leopards players
Oldham R.L.F.C. players
Rochdale Hornets players
Rugby league halfbacks
Rugby league hookers
Rugby league players from Salford
Rugby league utility players
Salford Red Devils coaches
Salford Red Devils players
Swinton Lions coaches
Swinton Lions players
Wales national rugby league team players
Widnes Vikings players
Workington Town players